Miss Jamaica may refer to:
 Miss Earth Jamaica, a beauty pageant that selects Jamaica's representative to Miss Earth
 Miss Jamaica Universe, a beauty pageant that selects Jamaica's representative to Miss Universe
 Miss Jamaica World, a beauty pageant that selects Jamaica's representative to Miss World
 Miss Jamaica Global, a beauty pageant that selects Jamaica's representative to Miss Global International